Greg Mullins may refer to:
 Greg Mullins (baseball)
 Greg Mullins (firefighter)